Mount Thorne is a prominent peak, 1,465 m, rising on the east flank of Amundsen Glacier, 6 nautical miles (11 km) northwest of Mount Goodale, in the Hays Mountains of the Queen Maud Mountains. Discovered in December 1929 by the Byrd Antarctic Expedition geological party under Laurence Gould, and named for George A. Thorne, topographer and dog driver with that party.

Mountains of the Ross Dependency
Amundsen Coast